The Admiral T. J. Lopez Bridge is a truss bridge crossing the Kanawha River at Chelyan, West Virginia, named for 4-star admiral Thomas J. Lopez. The Warren truss bridge cost $25.9 million to build, and was opened to traffic on June 30, 1997. It serves as a connection between I-64/I-77 (West Virginia Turnpike), U.S. Route 60 (US 60), and West Virginia Route 61 (WV 61).

History

The current bridge replaced an earlier crossing known simply as the Chelyan Bridge. The main span over the navigable channel was a  cantilever truss with  side spans. It was sold to the state of West Virginia in 1946 and, despite several rehabilitation projects over the years, continuing deterioration of the bridge required a load limit to be imposed. The bridge was documented by the West Virginia Division of Highways for the Historic American Engineering Record in 1993 prior to its replacement.

See also
List of bridges documented by the Historic American Engineering Record in West Virginia

References

External links

Historic American Engineering Record in West Virginia
Former toll bridges in West Virginia
Road bridges in West Virginia
Buildings and structures in Kanawha County, West Virginia
Warren truss bridges in the United States